Three Bad Men and a Girl is a 1915 American silent Western black and white film directed by Francis Ford and written by Grace Cunard. This film is reminiscent of The Desert Breed (1915).

Cast
 Francis Ford as Joe
 Jack Ford as Jim
 Major Paleolagus as Shorty
 Grace Cunard as Grace
 Lewis Short as Sheriff
 E.J. Denecke as Sheriff's Assistant

References

External links
 

American silent short films
American black-and-white films
Films directed by Francis Ford
Films with screenplays by Grace Cunard
Universal Pictures short films
1915 Western (genre) films
1915 short films
1915 films
Silent American Western (genre) films
1910s American films